Pascuala Rosado (1954-1996) was a Peruvian community leader from the district of Huaycán. She was killed by Shining Path in 1996. She had recently returned to Peru after spending several years abroad due to death threats. She was first targeted by Shining Path in 1992, after President Alberto Fujimori visited Huaycán to celebrate the formation of a new civilian anti-crime force. At the time Rosado was Huaycán's highest elected official.

References

Victims of Shining Path
1954 births
1996 deaths